Mychael Danna (born September 20, 1958) is a Canadian composer of film and television scores. He won both the Golden Globe and Oscar for Best Original Score for Life of Pi. He has also won an Emmy Award for Outstanding Music Composition for a Miniseries, Movie or a Special (Original Dramatic Score) in his work on the miniseries World Without End.

Early life and education
Danna was born in Winnipeg, Manitoba, but his family moved to Burlington, Ontario, when he was four weeks old. He is the brother of fellow composer Jeff Danna. He studied music composition at the University of Toronto, winning the Glenn Gould Composition Scholarship in 1985.

Career
Danna served for five years as composer-in-residence at the McLaughlin Planetarium in Toronto (1987–1992). Works for dance include music for Dead Souls (Carbone Quatorze Dance Company, directed by Gilles Maheu 1996), and a score for the Royal Winnipeg Ballet's Gita Govinda (2001) based on the 1000-year-old classical Gita Govinda, with choreographer Nina Menon. In June 2014, Danna was awarded an honorary doctorate by the University of Toronto, for his career achievements in the field of music.

He has been scoring films since his 1987 feature debut for Atom Egoyan's Family Viewing, a score which earned Danna the first of his thirteen Genie Award nominations. He has won five times for Achievement in Music - Original Score. Danna is recognized as one of the pioneers of combining non-Western sound sources with orchestral and electronic minimalism in the world of film music. This reputation has led him to work with such directors as Atom Egoyan, Deepa Mehta, Terry Gilliam, Scott Hicks, Ang Lee, Gillies MacKinnon, James Mangold, Mira Nair, Billy Ray, Joel Schumacher, and Denzel Washington. His soundtrack for Ang Lee's Life of Pi earned two Academy Award nominations for Best Original Score and Best Original Song for Pi's Lullaby.

Other films include Dan Scanlon's Onward, Mimi Leder's On the Basis of Sex,  Nora Twomey's The Breadwinner, Bennett Miller's Capote and Moneyball and Marc Webb's (500) Days of Summer.

On September 30, 2021, Danna received a Career Achievement Award from the Zurich Film Festival.

Personal life
Danna's wife Aparna is of Indian origin; the couple have two sons. He is the older brother of composer Jeff Danna.

Filmography

References

Further reading

External links
  – official site
 
 
 Mychael Danna talks about The Nativity Story

1958 births
Living people
Animated film score composers
Best Original Music Score Academy Award winners
Best Original Score Genie and Canadian Screen Award winners
Canadian classical composers
Canadian film score composers
Canadian male classical composers
Golden Globe Award-winning musicians
Male film score composers
Musicians from Winnipeg
Pixar people
University of Toronto alumni
Varèse Sarabande Records artists